Zdeněk Procházka (12 January 1928 – 24 September 2016) was a Czechoslovak football midfielder who played for Czechoslovakia in the 1954 FIFA World Cup. He also played for AC Sparta Prague.

References

External links
 Profile at the ČMFS website

1928 births
2016 deaths
Czech footballers
Czechoslovak footballers
Czechoslovakia international footballers
Association football midfielders
AC Sparta Prague players
FK Viktoria Žižkov players
1954 FIFA World Cup players
Recipients of the Milan Rastislav Stefanik Order